Bisgaardia hudsonensis is a Gram-negative and rod-shaped bacterium from the genus of Bisgaardia which has been isolated from the lungs of a dead ringed seal (Phoca hispida) from the Eastern Hudson Bay in Canada.

References

External links
Type strain of Bisgaardia hudsonensis at BacDive -  the Bacterial Diversity Metadatabase

Pasteurellales
Bacteria described in 2011